The X-Mansion or Xavier Institute is the common name for a mansion and research institute appearing in American comic books published by Marvel Comics. The mansion is depicted as the private estate of Charles Francis Xavier, a character in X-Men comics. It serves as the base of operations and training site of the X-Men. It is also the location of an accredited private school for mutant children, teenagers, and sometimes older aged mutants, the Xavier Institute for Higher Learning, formerly the Xavier School for Gifted Youngsters. The X-Mansion is also the worldwide headquarters of the X-Corporation.

The X-Mansion's address is 1407 Graymalkin Lane, Salem Center, located in Westchester County, New York. The school's motto is "mutatis mutandis". In a 2011 edition of the comic, Wolverine re-opens the school, at the same address, under the name of the Jean Grey School for Higher Learning. After the Terrigen Cloud becomes toxic enough to mutants that they die from M-Pox, Storm has the mansion (renamed X-Haven) moved to Limbo to keep mutants safe from the Terrigen while a cure is sought. After Medusa destroys the Terrigen Cloud so the mutants could survive, Kitty Pryde moves the mansion from Limbo to Central Park, New York, and renames it the Xavier Institute for Mutant Education and Outreach.

History
The X-Mansion is the inherited property of Charles Xavier (Professor X) and has been in the Xavier family for ten generations including two known mutants in the lineage, both becoming detached from the family. Little else is known about them or their mutations.

As Xavier's School for Gifted Youngsters, the X-Mansion was the training site of the first two generations of teenage X-Men:

 The X-Men: 1st Class – Cyclops, Iceman, Angel, Beast, Jean Grey (Marvel Girl), Havok, Lorna Dane (Polaris) and then later Mimic will join the team as well.
 The original New Mutants – Cannonball, Wolfsbane, Mirage, Karma, Sunspot, Cypher, Magma, Magik, and Warlock along with Shadowcat, a contemporary member of the original New Mutants who was their classmate but was a member of the adult X-Men team instead.

In X-Men vol. 2 #38 (Nov. 1994), the X-Mansion was renamed from Xavier's School for Gifted Youngsters to the Xavier Institute for Higher Learning, as most of the X-Men were adults rather than teenagers by this time. Xavier's School for Gifted Youngsters was relocated to the Massachusetts Academy in Western Massachusetts (a Marvel created town or region called Snow Valley somewhere in The Berkshires), which served as the training site of the third generation of teenage X-Men beginning in Generation X #1 (Nov. 1994).

 Generation X – Skin, Synch, M, Husk, Jubilee, Chamber, Blink, Mondo, Gaia, and Penance

The Massachusetts Academy closes permanently in Generation X #75 (June 2001). Shortly thereafter, the school for young mutants is reopened at the X-Mansion, but the name remains "The Xavier Institute for Higher Learning" despite the younger student body. The fourth generation of mutant teenagers, featured in Grant Morrison's New X-Men (2001–2004) and in New Mutants (2003–2004; relaunched as New X-Men: Academy X, July 2004–Feb. 2008), study at the mansion until it is destroyed during the 2007–2008 story "Messiah Complex" and the X-Men subsequently disband and close the institute.

Though protected by high-tech defenses, the X-Mansion has often been breached by the supervillains and evil mutants faced by the X-Men. Indeed, the X-Mansion has been destroyed and rebuilt several times. It was demolished in a battle with the Sidri in The Uncanny X-Men #154 (Feb. 1982) and atomized by Mister Sinister in The Uncanny X-Men #243 (April 1989). It was rebuilt by a future Franklin Richards in moments but reverted to its destroyed state after the time-traveler became confused.

Certain portions of the mansion, such as extensive sub-basements, survived both demolitions. When Onslaught revealed himself and fought the X-Men (X-Men #54 (June 1996) and Onslaught: X-Men), the mansion took heavy damage, though was quickly repaired in-between issues after the "Onslaught" storyline. In Operation: Zero Tolerance, Bastion forced Jubilee to reveal the mansion's defenses. He then stripped down the mansion, having everything inside the mansion removed, even down to the paint on the walls. After defeating Bastion, the X-Men moved back into the mansion, as detailed in X-Men #70 (Nov. 1997). The X-Mansion survived an assault by the Shi'ar in New X-Men #122–126 (March–July 2002) as well as a riot by students led by Quentin Quire in New X-Men #134–138 (Jan.–May 2003). In the Planet X storyline of New X-Men #146–150, however, the X-Mansion was destroyed; the rebuilding process could be seen in New X-Men #155–156 (June 2004). In the wake of M-Day the mansion was infiltrated by followers of the Reverend William Stryker in an attempt to wipe out the students, resulting in some structural damage and several casualties. Then the mansion was severely damaged when the Danger Room became sentient and summoned local machinery to attack the structure. The mansion was also damaged when Mr. Sinister's new team of Marauders attacked the mansion. A fight between the Hulk and several mutants heavily damaged the mansion. In the Messiah Complex storyline, the mansion was completely destroyed by attacking Sentinels.

Unlike past times, the mansion was not rebuilt for a considerable length of time. Rather, the X-Men and their students relocated to a new base of operations in San Francisco. Under the name Graymalkin Industries, the new X-base is not run as a school, but rather as a sort of community center for mutants who wish to develop their powers.

Faculty (pre-"Messiah Complex")

 Shadowcat teaches computer science classes and, in addition to being a member of the senior staff, acts as a student advisor and liaison for the senior staff.
 Karma teaches French and is in charge of those students who are too young to join the training squads. She also oversees the library.
 Nightcrawler teaches music, art, life sciences, and drama.
 Beast teaches science and mathematics and is part of the senior staff, presumably overseeing the curriculum.
 Emma Frost, besides being the headmistress of the Xavier Institute, also teaches English, business, and ethics, much to the horror of Kitty Pryde. She also presides over the new team of X-Men, teaching them to work as a team, with some assistance from the senior staff, such as Colossus.
 Wolverine teaches close quarters combat.
 Cyclops, besides being the headmaster of the Xavier Institute, also teaches the elective leadership and tactics.
 Northstar, before his death (and later resurrection), taught business and consumer law classes, as well as a flying class for those students with flight powers. He also mentored the Alpha Squadron training squad.
 Iceman, being a Certified Public Accountant, teaches classes in mathematics, finance, and accounting.
 Gambit teaches a target practice class for students with projectile-based powers. He also mentors the Chevaliers training squad.
 Wolfsbane, in addition to mentoring the Paragons, is a teaching assistant in Beast's science class.

Post X-Men: Schism
After the events of X-Men: Schism, Wolverine and half of the X-Men return to Westchester, New York and the X-Mansion. The name of the school is now the Jean Grey School for Higher Learning. Its grounds are in fact a spawn of Krakoa the Living Island. In the first issue of Wolverine and the X-Men an entirely new school is built on the grounds. It is funded mainly with scientific advancements by the students and diamonds from Krakoa.

 Storm – Headmistress 
 Beast – Vice-Principal
 Rogue – Senior Staff
 Iceman – Senior Staff
 Rachel Summers – Senior Staff
 Northstar – Senior Staff
 Firestar – Senior Staff
 Chamber – Junior Staff
 Frenzy – Junior Staff
 Karma – Junior Staff
 Husk – Junior Staff
 Warbird – Junior Staff
 Deathlok – Adjunct Staff/Campus Guard
 Doop – Adjunct Staff
 Spider-Man – Adjunct Staff/Guidance Counselor
 Angel – Graduate Assistant/Recruiter
 Dr. Cecilia Reyes – Resident Physician
 Kavita Rao – Resident Doctor
 Jubilee – Resident/Member
 Armor – Member
 Pixie – Member
 Kid Omega – Member
 Nightcrawler – Member
 Colossus – Member

After Wolverine dies in the "Death of Wolverine" storyline, Spider-Man becomes a Guidance Counselor in the series Spider-Man and the X-Men.

X-Haven
Under the All-New, All-Different Marvel re-branding, X-Haven was a sanctuary founded by Storm and her Extraordinary X-Men to protect mutants from the Terrigen Mist. The Jean Grey School for Higher Learning was temporarily teleported to a pocket dimension within Limbo with the help of Doctor Strange, the Scarlet Witch, and Wiccan. It also has magical defenses created by Magik to keep the Demons away.

The Xavier Institute for Mutant Education and Outreach
Following the War between the Inhumans and mutants which resulted in the destruction of the remaining Terrigen Cloud, Kitty Pryde, now the new Headmistress of the Jean Grey School for Higher Learning had Magik teleport the school back to Earth, more precisely to Central Park, New York City and renames it as the Xavier Institute for Mutant Education and Outreach. It was demolished after the events of Extermination.

Layout
In the middle of the main courtyard is the Phoenix Memorial Statue, dedicated to the memory of Jean Grey. Notable rooms include the Danger Room and a room containing Cerebro. The Headmasters Office of Cyclops and Emma Frost is on the top floor.

The basketball court is a popular hang-out. It was the site of a basketball game in X-Men #4 (Jan. 1992) in which the X-Men used their mutant powers. Directly below the basketball court is the hangar, which houses many transportation vehicles, as well as aircraft such as the X-Men Blackbird.

There is also a cemetery with memorials for deceased X-Men like Thunderbird and others.

Other versions

Age of Apocalypse
In the Age of Apocalypse reality, the remains of the X-Mansion were the headquarters for a mutant resistance cell against Apocalypse – a mutant that had conquered North America. The Mansion survives, and many new mutants come to the School in hope of shelter.

Mutant X
In the darker continuity of Mutant X, the X-Mansion is run by Magneto, who had long ago taken up Professor X's dream. The mansion is vaporized in a nuclear explosion.

Prelude to Deadpool Corps
In issue #2, the X-Mansion is shown to be an orphanage for troubled kids that is run by Professor X and the teachers include Storm and Beast. Some of the orphans include kid versions of Deadpool, Scott Summers, Wolverine, Angel, and Colossus.

Ultimate Marvel
In the Ultimate Marvel universe, the X-Mansion does not differ much. However, it is not entirely funded by inheritance. Though the school originally was funded from Magneto's inheritance, allowing them to neither accept nor seek out donations. Its policies have since changed after Magneto's departure and Xavier's subsequent control over the facility. Later, the students question and ridicule the unlikeliness of the facility simply being funded by inheritance. It is then revealed that numerous donors fund Xavier's projects and remain anonymous due to heavy anti-mutant sentiments present in public opinion. One of the biggest donors was the Hellfire Club, who were revealed to have an ulterior motive for doing so. In Xavier's conversation with Lilandra Neramani, it's discovered that S.H.I.E.L.D. were former financiers before their falling out with Xavier; it is unknown what their intentions were. The Church of the Shi'ar have become major investors.

The school's location is concealed by a projected image of a Jehovah's Witness chapter, as revealed in Ultimate X-Men #1.

The mansion is purposely demolished by Iceman in "Ultimate Requiem" following the events of the "Ultimatum" storyline. This is because the team had been devastated by Magneto's attack and the survivors were going on the run.

In other media

Television
The X-Mansion appears in Spider-Man and His Amazing Friends. In "The Origin of Iceman", a flashback showed that Iceman traveled there after being invited by Professor X to join the X-Men. In "A Firestar is Born", Iceman and Firestar return to the X-Mansion for a reunion party where they meet the latest members Storm and Wolverine. Spider-Man even arrived when Juggernaut attacks the X-Mansion to target Professor X. In "The Education of a Superhero", the X-Mansion is seen when Spider-Man, Iceman, and Firestar enlist the X-Men to continue Videoman's training. In "The X-Men Adventure", the X-Mansion is attacked by Cyberiad at the time when Spider-Man, Iceman, and Firestar were helping the X-Men test out the new Danger Room programs.
The X-Mansion appeared in X-Men: Pryde of the X-Men.
The X-Mansion appeared in the X-Men television series.
The X-Mansion appears in the two-part Spider-Man episode "The Mutant Agenda". Spider-Man travels there to see Professor X in hopes that he can help figure out what he is changing into.
The X-Mansion appears in X-Men: Evolution. It has the same address, but is located in Bayville, New York.
The X-Mansion appears in the animated series Wolverine and the X-Men. It is destroyed by a massive explosion (which was later revealed to have been caused by the Phoenix Force) with the help of Forge and the money of Angel, it was rebuilt just in time for the X-Men to save the world from the Brotherhood of Mutants, the Sentinels and the Phoenix Force.
The X-Mansion appears in The Super Hero Squad Show. It is shown as part of Super Hero City and is depicted as a white circular building with an X-logo on top. In "Mysterious Mayhem at Mutant Academy", the interior of the X-Mansion is shown as a normal school with the Danger Room also serving as a detention hall and a cafeteria.
The X-Mansion is mentioned in The Avengers: Earth's Mightiest Heroes episode "Masters of Evil"; a newspaper has a photo of it with the cover story "Secret School for Mutants?".
A variation or early version of the X-Mansion appears in Season 3 of the FX series Legion. The home used for the Xavier mansion in this iteration is the Stimson House Castle at 2421 S. Figueroa Street in Los Angeles, California. A historical landmark built in 1893, the Stimson House has been used in several films and television programs such as the TV series Pushing Daisies and the 1987 feature film House II: The Second Story.

Film
 The X-Mansion was featured in Generation X (a live action, made-for-television movie that came out on FOX in 1996).
 The X-Mansion is featured prominently in the X-Men film series.
 In X-Men (2000), the exterior of the X-Mansion was filmed at the Casa Loma, Toronto, and the Parkwood Estate at Oshawa, Ontario, Canada.
 In the superhero films X2: X-Men United (2003), X-Men: The Last Stand (2006), Deadpool (2016), and Deadpool 2 (2018) Hatley Castle at Royal Roads University in Victoria, British Columbia was used for the interior and exterior of the X-Mansion. Elements of Hatley Castle's exterior influenced the new versions of the X-Mansion in X-Men: Days of Future Past, X-Men: Apocalypse, and Dark Phoenix.
 In X-Men: First Class (2011), the role of the X-Mansion is played by the Englefield House, an Elizabethan manor in Berkshire, England.

Video games
 In the fighting game, X-Men: Next Dimension, the X-Mansion served as one of the arenas to fight within, as well as on the foregrounds.
 The X-Mansion appears in X-Men Legends. It serves as a hub for the X-Men.
 In X-Men Legends II: Rise of Apocalypse, Beast was at the Mansion trying to locate Apocalypse. Instead, Apocalypse and his men invaded the X-Mansion, abducted Beast upon defeating him, and destroyed the entire building. The remains serve as a Hub during Apocalypse's invasion on New York.
 The X-Mansion appears in Marvel: Ultimate Alliance. When Weasel is looking for somewhere to hide from S.H.I.E.L.D., he asks the players if he would be able to hide out at the Baxter Building or the X-Mansion. As Hank Pym mentions to the player that Mister Fantastic tends to work with S.H.I.E.L.D., Professor X mentions to the player that having S.H.I.E.L.D. Soldiers within his home would not sit well with his fellow X-Men. This causes Weasel to choose the X-Mansion as a hide-out. During that time if the player asks Storm on Weasel's status while in Asgard, she states that Beast caught Weasel hacking into Cerebro, Forge caught Weasel in the X-Jet Hangar, and Emma Frost caught Weasel near Wolverine's bikes. When Weasel is done with the job and the player asks Storm on the X-Mansion's status, she says that she thinks everyone is ready for him to leave because Colossus got back from his trip to Russia and found Weasel in the kitchen and started beating him up. Luckily for Weasel, Karma managed to get between them and explain who Weasel was. Weasel also mentions earlier that Beast (or the "Big Blue Ape" as he calls him) kept asking him when he is going to leave.
 The X-Mansion appears in Marvel Heroes. It serves as a hub for the players.
 The X-Mansion appears in Lego Marvel Super Heroes. It is located in Inwood, Manhattan. During the game, Magneto leads his Brotherhood of Mutants and his Acolyte soldiers into raiding the X-Mansion to steal back the Tesseract for Doctor Doom. The X-Men had to fight the Brotherhood of Mutants members and the Acolyte soldiers while getting the X-Mansion's students to safety. During free roam, the players can visit the X-Mansion where they use their characters to help out Professor X with different things like helping the X-Mansion's students get through their challenges and fight a Sentinel.

Books
 The X-Mansion appears at the end of the X-Men/Star Trek crossover novel Planet X. Q and Watcher have a discussion while observing the X-Men on its lawn.
 X-Men: Survival Guide to the Mansion Vol 1 No 1; is a comic book written as if the reader is a new student attending the X-Mansion. It gives helpful advice on how to survive living with the X-Men and fellow mutant students.

See also
 Graymalkin Industries
 Avengers Mansion
 Baxter Building
 Triskelion
 Xavier Institute student body

References

External links
 https://uncannyxmen.net/x-marks-the-spot/xavier-institute
 Hatley Castle – The actual house used in the X-Men movies.
 Xavier Mansion Tour: Join Storm For A Tour Of The Mansion!

1963 in comics
Fictional elements introduced in 1963
X-Men
Marvel Comics locations
Fictional houses
New York (state) in fiction
Superhero schools
Mansions